The Punisher is an action adventure third-person shooter developed by Volition and published by THQ. It was released in 2005 for Microsoft Windows, PlayStation 2, and Xbox; a mobile phone game was also developed by Amplified Games and released in 2004. The game stars the Marvel Comics antihero, The Punisher. After his family was murdered by the Mafia, Frank Castle devoted his life to the punishment of criminals. Players take control of the titular ruthless vigilante to track down and kill criminals.

The game's story is a loose mixture of the 2004 film of the same name, as well as the Vol. 5 (2000) and Vol. 6 (2001) series of the comic books. Actor Thomas Jane reprises his role as Frank Castle/The Punisher. The game features many cameo appearances from Marvel Comics characters, such as Iron Man, Nick Fury, Black Widow, Matt Murdock (the alter ego of Daredevil), Bushwacker, Kingpin and Bullseye. Also present are several characters from the Welcome Back, Frank storyline such as detectives Martin Soap and Molly von Richthofen, the Punisher's neighbors Joan and Spacker Dave, Ma Gnucci, The Russian and General Kreigkopf.

An earlier video game adaptation of the film was in development by Mucky Foot Productions but it was cancelled when THQ decided to bring development in-house.

Gameplay

Gameplay in The Punisher offers a combination of exploration and combat. When encountering an enemy, the Punisher can attack, or perform a one-button "quick kill". Depending on the villain, the current location, and a player-determined level of aggression, one of numerous fatal assaults will be performed. The game's environments also feature interrogation "hot spots", where the Punisher can interrogate his enemies using death threats and torture, coercing them to share information that may help him in his quest. The game punishes the player for shooting innocent people by ending the level.

Plot
The game begins with a cinematic of the Punisher (Thomas Jane) killing several footmen of the Yakuza. After he leaves the building, he is apprehended by law enforcement in front of an unknown building. He is then transferred to Ryker's Island and interrogated by police detectives Molly von Richthofen (Julie Nathanson) and Martin Soap (Michael Gough). The majority of the game occurs in flashbacks during this interrogation.

First, the Punisher raids a crack house and eventually kills its owner Damage (Steven Blum) by dropping him from several stories above the ground. After almost getting hit by a car upon his exit, the Punisher traces the vehicle to a chop shop. After slaughtering the criminals there, he learns that it is owned by the Gnucci crime family, led by Ma Gnucci (Saffron Henderson), because Carlo Duka (John Cygan), the shop's owner, is a Gnucci lieutenant; the Punisher drops him in a car compactor where Duka is subsequently crushed. In a subsequent mission, the Punisher kills one of Ma Gnucci's sons, Bobby, at Lucky's Bar.

Ma Gnucci hires Bushwacker (Phil Hayes) to capture Joan (Julie Nathanson), a neighbor of the Punisher. The Punisher traces her to the Central Park Zoo, where he rescues her. The next mission occurs in Grey's Funeral Home, at the mob funeral of Bobby Gnucci. The Punisher massacres the funeral party and kills Eddie Gnucci (John Cygan) by throwing Eddie out a window and impaling him onto a spike. The Punisher then travels to the Gnucci estate to kill Bushwacker and Ma Gnucci herself. After fighting his way through Ma's remaining men, Punisher then fights Bushwacker who he defeats in a gunfight. To finish off Bushwacker, Punisher rips his weapon arm off and shoots him in the chest followed by Punisher dropping Bushwacker several stories above the ground. Castle hunts down Ma and kills her.

During the Punisher's assault at the Gnucci residence, he learns that the Gnuccis are getting drug money from Russian mercenaries at New York City's waterfront. At the docks, he hears that General Kreigkopf (Bob Joles) plans to smuggle nuclear weapons into New York City. He clears a suspected cargo ship of white slavers but fails to find the device. After being assaulted in his apartment by a large man called the Russian (Darryl Kurylo), the Punisher attacks Grand Nixon Island, his next lead on the weapon's location. On the island, the Punisher meets Nick Fury, who helps him defeat Kreigkopf and the Russian as well as prevent the launch of the nuclear device. Both escape before the missile detonates, destroying Grand Nixon Island.

Returning home, the Punisher discovers that Kingpin (David Sobolov) has been taking over former Gnucci rackets. He raids the headquarters of the Kingpin's Fisk Industries, where he fights and defeats Bullseye (Steven Blum) by throwing him out a window from the top floor of the skyscraper. Kingpin tells the Punisher that his real enemy is the Japanese Yakuza. The Punisher learns that this group of Yakuza are called the Eternal Sun, and they are trying to control remaining Gnucci and Russian crime operations.

The Punisher then visits Stark Towers, a facility owned by Tony Stark/Iron Man, after learning that the Eternal Sun are attempting to steal some high tech weapons and armor. The Punisher decides to assault the Takagi building, the home of the Eternal Sun leader, Takagi. He discovers that Jigsaw (Darryl Kurylo) has infiltrated the gang, and is gaining followers. While Jigsaw is being imprisoned in Ryker's Island, the Eternal Sun is already planning to bust him out. After escaping the Takagi building, the Punisher allows himself to be captured by Det. Martin Soap, who has been providing information to the Punisher. He is taken to Ryker's Island, as per his plan.

At this time, the flashbacks catch up to the story, and the remainder of the game takes place in the present. During the interrogation, a riot erupts in the prison. The Punisher escapes from his cell, and starts fighting his way through the inmates and remaining Eternal Sun members the Punisher left alive. He reaches the rooftop and meets Jigsaw face to face, ultimately defeating him despite the stolen Iron Man armor Jigsaw was wearing. As the Punisher leaves in a helicopter, he throws Jigsaw out, killing him.

In the post-credits scene, Bullseye is loaded onto a stretcher as Kingpin is seen plotting his revenge against the Punisher.

Reception

The game received mixed reviews, criticizing the game's sound effects and the linear and repetitive gameplay, but praising its system of torture, the storyline, the inordinate amount of violence and Punisher himself. Maxim contributor Gene Newman opined in his review that this game "[made] the Grand Theft Auto series look like Super Mario Kart". Detroit Free Press gave the Xbox version a score of three stars out of four and stated: "This isn't a game that requires a lot of skill. But if you can get past the gore, it's a rarity in the comic book world: a game that stays true to the original work and doesn't stink". The Sydney Morning Herald, however, gave the game a score of three stars out of five and called it "dark, violent and derivative, but nowhere near as flawed as the movie".

The game sold around one million copies and was profitable for Volition.

Controversy
The Punisher features extremely gruesome scenes of torture and gore; the ESRB stated that an initial cut of the game would meet its "Adults Only" rating (which severely hampers commercial availability because neither Microsoft, nor Sony allow Adults Only titles on their systems). Much like Manhunt 2, the developers made slight censors to the deaths found within special "interrogation" scenes by rendering them in black and white in order to reduce their visual impact. The revised version was able to meet the "Mature" rating.

In the UK, the BBFC worked with THQ to further extend the solarization effect on the scenes, distancing the camera before the killings and adding a zoom effect during them, in order to pass it with an 18 certificate, making The Punisher one of the only games to require BBFC cuts in order to be rated 18.

In Australia, the ACB demanded similar cuts, including the removal of two scenes altogether. In Germany, the game was placed on the Federal Department for Media Harmful to Young Persons BPjS/BPjM list.

Notes

References

External links

 
 

2004 video games
2005 video games
Sony Pictures video games
M-Rated Marvel Comics video games
Windows games
Xbox games
PlayStation 2 games
Organized crime video games
Third-person shooters
THQ games
Censored video games
Video games based on Marvel Comics films
Video games based on Punisher
Video games set in New York City
Video games set in prison
Video games set on fictional islands
Obscenity controversies in video games
Video games using Havok
Single-player video games
Video games developed in the United States